The 1952 Kentucky Wildcats football team represented the University of Kentucky in the 1952 college football season. The Wildcats scored 181 points while allowing 180 points. Kentucky finished the season ranked #20 in the final AP Poll.  It was the seventh consecutive winning season for the Wildcats with Bear Bryant as the head coach.

Schedule

1953 NFL Draft

Awards and honors
Steve Mellinger, Defensive End, All-America selection

References

Kentucky
Kentucky Wildcats football seasons
Kentucky Wildcats football